Benjamin Robert William Stebbings (born 4 October 1989) is an English cricketer. Stebbings is a right-handed batsman who bowls right-arm medium pace. He was born in Oxford, Oxfordshire.

While studying for his degree at Oxford Brookes, Stebbings made his first-class debut for Oxford MCCU against Northamptonshire in 2010. He made three further first-class appearance for the team, the last of which came against Nottinghamshire in 2011. In four matches, he scored 90 runs at an average of 6.00, with a high score of 29.

Prior to his studies, Stebbings had made his debut in Minor counties cricket for Herefordshire against Shropshire in the 2007 MCCA Knockout Trophy. He continues to play for Herefordshire.

References

External links
Benjamin Stebbings at ESPNcricinfo
Benjamin Stebbings at CricketArchive

1989 births
Living people
Cricketers from Oxford
Alumni of Oxford Brookes University
English cricketers
Herefordshire cricketers
Oxford MCCU cricketers